Johann Grueber (28 October 1623, Linz – 30 September 1680, Sárospatak, Hungary) was an Austrian Jesuit missionary and astronomer in China, and noted explorer.

Life

He joined the Society of Jesus in 1641 and went to China in 1656, where he was active at the court of Peking as professor of mathematics and assistant to Father Adam Schall von Bell. In 1661 his superiors sent him, together with the Belgian Father Albert Dorville (D'Orville), to Rome in order to defend Schall's work on the Chinese calendar (He was accused of encouraging 'superstitious practices').

As it was impossible to journey by sea on account of the blockade of Macau by the Dutch, they conceived the daring idea of going overland from Peking to Goa (India) by way of Tibet and Nepal. This led to Grueber's memorable journey (Dorville died on the way), which won him fame as one of the most successful explorers of the seventeenth century (Tonnier). They first travelled to Sinning-fu, on the borders of Kan-su; thence through the Kukunor territory and Kalmyk Tartary (Desertum Kalnac) to Lhasa. They crossed the difficult mountain passes of the Himalayas, arrived at Kathmandu, Nepal, and thence descended into the  basin of the Ganges: Patna and Agra, the former capital of the Mughal empire. This journey lasted 214 days.

Dorville died at Agra, a victim of the hardships he had undergone. Jesuit Father Heinrich Roth, a Sanskrit scholar, substituted for Dorville and with Grueber carried on the overland journey through Persia and Turkey, reaching Rome on the 2 February 1664. Their journey showed the possibility of a direct overland connection between China and India, and the value and significance of the Himalayan passes.

Biographer Richard Tronnier says: "It is due to Grueber's energy that Europe received the first correct information concerning Thibet and its inhabitants". Although Oderico of Pordenone had traversed Tibet, in 1327, and visited Lhasa, he had not written any account of this journey. Antonio de Andrada and Manuel Marquez had pushed their explorations as far as Tsaparang on the northern Setledj.

Emperor Leopold I requested that Grueber return to China via Russia in order to explore the possibility of another land route through central Asia, but the journey ended at Constantinople as Grueber fell seriously sick. He was obliged to return. Though in poor health Grueber lived another 14 years as preacher and spiritual guide in the Jesuit schools of Trnava (Slovakia) and Sárospatak (Hungary) where he died in 1680.

Literature on his journey

An account of this first journey through Tibet in modern times by a European was published by Athanasius Kircher to whom Grueber had left his journals and charts, which he had supplemented by numerous verbal and written additions ("China illustrata", Amsterdam, 1667, 64-67). In the French edition of "China" (Amsterdam, 1670) is also incorporated a letter of Grueber written to the Duke of Tuscany.

For letters of Grueber see "Neue Welt-Bott" (Augsburg and Gratz, 1726), no. 34; Thévenot (whose acquaintance Grueber had made in Constantinople), "Divers voyages curieux" (Paris, 1666, 1672, 1692), II; extracts in Ritter, "Asien" (Berlin, 1833), II, 173; III, 453; IV, 88, 183; Anzi, "II genio vagante" (Parma, 1692), III, 331-399.

References

Carlieri, Notizie varie dell' Imperio della China (Florence, 1697)
Ashley, Collection of voyages (London, 1745–47), IV, 651sq
 
Von Richthofen, China (Berlin, 1877), 761, etc., with routes and plate, the best monograph
Tronnier, Die Durchquerung Tibets seitens der Jesuiten Joh. Grueber und Albert de Dorville im Jahre 1661 in Zeitschr, d. Ges.fur Erdkunde zu Berlin, 1904, pp. 328–361
Wessels, C., Early Jesuit Travellers in Central Asia, The Hague, 1924, pp. 164–203.

External links

1623 births
1665 deaths
17th-century Austrian Jesuits
Jesuit missionaries in China
Austrian Roman Catholic missionaries
Explorers of Asia
Christian missionaries in Central Asia
Explorers of Central Asia
Roman Catholic missionaries in China
Roman Catholic missionaries in Tibet
Austrian astronomers
Jesuit scientists
People from Linz
Jesuit missionaries in India
Explorers of India
Explorers of Nepal